Subonoba is a genus of small sea snails in the family Rissoidae.

Species
The genus contains 26 species, including:
 Subonoba alpha Powell, 1955
 Subonoba aupouria Powell, 1940
 Subonoba beta Powell, 1955
 Subonoba candidissima (Webster, 1905)
 Subonoba delicatula Powell, 1933
 Subonoba delta Powell, 1955
 Subonoba edita Powell, 1939
 Subonoba fallai Powell, 1955
 Subonoba foveauxiana (Suter, 1898)
 Subonoba fumata (Suter, 1898)
 Subonoba gamma Powell, 1955
 Subonoba gelida (E.A. Smith, 1907)
 Subonoba inornata Powell, 1933
 Subonoba insculpta (Murdoch, 1905)
 Subonoba iredalei (Powell, 1937)
 Subonoba kermadecensis (Powell, 1927)
 Subonoba morioria Powell, 1933
 Subonoba obliquata (Powell, 1940)
 Subonoba oliveri Powell, 1955
 Subonoba ovata (Thiele, 1912)
 Subonoba parvula Powell, 1931
 Subonoba paucicostata Powell, 1931
 Subonoba sorenseni Powell, 1955
 Subonoba tenuistriata Powell, 1933
 Subonoba turqueti (Lamy, 1905)
 Subonoba varicifera Bozzetti, 2019
Synonyms
 Subonoba bickertoni Hedley, 1916: synonym of Onoba turqueti (Lamy, 1906): synonym of Subonoba turqueti (Lamy, 1906)
 Subonoba contigua Powell, 1957: synonym of Onoba gelida (E. A. Smith, 1907): synonym of Subonoba gelida (E.A. Smith, 1907)
 Subonoba deserta (E. A. Smith, 1907): synonym of Powellisetia deserta (E. A. Smith, 1907)
 Subonoba glacialis (E. A. Smith, 1907): synonym of Eatoniella glacialis (E. A. Smith, 1907)
 Subonoba subantarctica Thiele, 1912: synonym of Onoba subantarctica (Thiele, 1912) (original combination)
 Subonoba wilkesiana Hedley, 1916: synonym of Onoba subantarctica wilkesiana (Hedley, 1916) (original combination)

References

 Ponder, W. F. (1967). The classification of the Rissoidae and Orbitestellidae with descriptions of some new taxa. Transactions of the Royal Society of New Zealand, Zoology. 9(17): 193–224, pls 1–13.

External links
 Iredale, T. (1915). A commentary on Suter's Manual of the New Zealand Mollusca. Transactions and Proceedings of the New Zealand Institute. 47: 417-497.
 Criscione, F., Ponder, W. F., Köhler, F., Takano, T. & Kano, Y. (2017). A molecular phylogeny of Rissoidae (Caenogastropoda: Rissooidea) allows testing the diagnostic utility of morphological traits. Zoological Journal of the Linnean Society. 179 , 23–40

Rissoidae